Trine Søndergaard (born 1972), is a Danish photography-based visual artist. Trine Søndergaard lives and works in Copenhagen, Denmark.

Søndergaard studied drawing and painting in Aalborg and Copenhagen from 1992 to 1994 and attended the photography school Fatamorgana in Copenhagen, Denmark.

Trine Søndergaard’s work is marked by a precision and a sensibility that co-exist with an investigation of the medium of photography, its boundaries and what constitutes an image. She is internationally acclaimed for her quiet and powerful imagery and she has received The Albert Renger-Patzsch Prize and the three-year working grant from the Danish Arts Foundation

The landscapes and mirrorings of memory, silent inner rooms, and women’s occupations and roles through history are all themes in Trine Søndergaard’s works. Her work is marked by a quiet emotion. In her photographic series she portrays rooms, landscapes, vegetation and people. With repetition and small displacements she lets the vision stop and wonder. The works create a kind of gap, a clearing in the existence, in which all stands out in a almost extreme concentration. Trine Søndergaard says: “With my camera I listen to reality”.

In her work, Trine Søndergaard’s starting point is documentary and straight photography. However, her use of reduction and repetition transforms the work into a kind of conceptual photography, and the dialogue with art history is always present in her oeuvre. The ordinary and the ceremonious are presented equally, and the undercurrents of melancholy, loss and the image as a condition transcending the verbal also characterize her work.

Trine Søndergaard has exhibited all over the world and is represented in several international collections among others Montreal Museum of Fine Art, Canada, The J.Paul Getty Museum, USA, MUSAC, Spain, Gothenburg Museum of Art, Sverige, Nasjonalmuseet, Norway, The Israel Museum, Israel, Maison Européenne de la Photographie, France and AROS, Denmark.

Søndergaard is represented by Martin Asbæk Gallery, Copenhagen.

Publications
203 WORKS by Trine Søndergaard. FabrikBooks and Gotheburg Museum of Art, 2020, 

HOVEDTØJ by Trine Søndergaard. FabrikBooks 2020, 

A ROOM INSIDE by Trine Søndergaard. Fabrikbooks 2017, 

STASIS by Trine Søndergaard. Hatje Cantz, Germany, December 2013, 

STRUDE by Trine Søndergaard. Museum Kunst der Westküste, Germany, 2012, 

DYING BIRDS by Trine Søndergaard & Nicolai Howalt. Hassla Books, New York, November 2010, 

HOW TO HUNT by Trine Søndergaard & Nicolai Howalt. Hatje Cantz, Germany, October 2010, 

STRUDE by Trine Søndergaard. Ny Carlsberg Glyptotek, Denmark, 2010, 

MONOCHROME PORTRAITS by Trine Søndergaard. Hatje Cantz, Germany, 2009, 

TREEZONE by Trine Søndergaard & Nicolai Howalt. Hassla Books, New York, January 2009, 

HOW TO HUNT by Trine Søndergaard & Nicolai Howalt. ArtPeople, Denmark, 2005,       

VERSUS by Trine Søndergaard. Thorvaldsens Museum, Denmark, 2003, 

NOW THAT YOU ARE MINE by Trine Søndergaard. Steidl, Germany, 2002,

Exhibitions

Solo exhibitions
2022 Untitled / Til Vægs, Copenhagen, Denmark
2021 Undisclosed, Martin Asbæk Gallery, Denmark
2021 Works, Den Sorte Diamant, Denmark
2021 Gl. Holtegaard, Denmark
2020 Dunkers Kulturhus, Sweden
2020 Göteborg Kunstmuseum, Sweden
2019 Skive Museum, Denmark
2019 Maison du Danemark, France
2019 Guldnakke, SCAD FASH Museum of Fashion & Film, Atlanta, USA
2019 Nearer the Time, Martin Asbæk Gallery, Denmark
2018 Still, MuMa-Le Havre, France
2018 A Reflection, Bruce Silverstein Gallery, New York, USA
2017 Vakuum, Brandts13, Denmark
2015 A Room Inside, Martin Asbæk Gallery, Denmark
2013 Birds, Trees and Hunting Scenes, N.Howalt & T.Søndergaard, Kunsthal Nord, Aalborg, Denmark
2013 Trine Søndergaard & Nicolai Howalt, Bruce Silverstein Gallery, New York, USA
2013 Stasis, Ffotogallery, Cardiff, England
2013 Monochrome Portraits, Hagedorn Foundation Gallery, Atlanta, USA
2012 Still, Martin Asbæk Gallery, København, Denmark
2012 Strude, Museum Kunst der Westkuste, Alkersum/Föhr, Germany 
2010 Monochrome Portraits, City Art Museum, Ljubjana, Slovenia 
2010 Strude II, Trine Søndergaard, Galleri Kant, Fanø, Denmark
2010 Trine Søndergaard, Bruce Silverstein Gallery, New York City
2010 Monochrome Portraits, Nessim Gallery, Budapest, Hungary
2010 Strude, Ny Carlsberg Glyptotek, Copenhagen, Denmark
2009 Mono, Galleri Image, Aarhus, Denmark
2009 Monochrome Portraits, Martin Asbæk Gallery, Copenhagen, Denmark
2008 Trine Søndergaard, Galleri Kant, Sønderho, Denmark
2003 Now That You Are Mine, Filosofgangen, Odense, Denmark (catalogue)
2003 Versus, Thorvaldsens Museum, Copenhagen, Denmark (catalogue)
2001 Now That You Are Mine, The National Photo Institute of the Nederlands, Rotterdam, The Netherlands
2000 Now That You Are Mine, IFSAK, Istanbul, Turkey
1998 Neighbours, International Meetings of Photography, Plovdiv, Bulgaria
1996 Kom de bagfra, Kanonhallen, Copenhagen, Denmark

Solo exhibitions: Trine Søndergaard & Nicolai Howalt
2011 How to Hunt, Maison du Danemark, Paris
2010 How to Hunt, ARoS, Aarhus Kunstmuseum, Arhus, Denmark
2009 Tree Zone, Volta, New York City
2007 How to Hunt, Fotografins Hus, Stockholm, Sweden
2007 Hunting Grounds, The Parisian Laundry, Mois de la Photo, Montreal, Canada (catalogue)
2007 How to Hunt, Bruce Silverstein Gallery, New York City
2006 Statement, ParisPhoto, Paris, France (catalogue)
2006 How to Hunt, Gallery Poller, Frankfurt, Germany
2006 How to Hunt, Faaborg Museum of Fine Art, Faaborg, Denmark (catalogue)
2005 How to Hunt, Martin Asbæk Projects, Copenhagen, Denmark

Group exhibitions
2022 Snowflakes and Other Surprises, Fotografisk Center, Denmark
2021 Grønningen, Den Frie Udstillingsbygning, Denmark
2021 In Reality – Fotografisk Center 25 Years, Fotografisk Center, Denmark
2020 Le Delta – Province de Namur, Belgium
2020 Thorvaldsens Museum, Denmark
2019 Grønningen, Gl Strand, Denmark 
2018 Form Follows Fiction, Kejatan Gallery, Berlin, Germany
2018 Reload, Museum Kunst der Westküste, Föhr, Germnany.
2017 Theses, Stiftung Christliche Kunst, Wittenberg, Germany
2016 Photography from Northern Western Europe, Fondazione Fotografia Modena, Italy
2015 Femina, Pavillon du Vendome, Paris, France
2014 Bikuben, Utah Museum of Contemporary Art, USA
2014 Contemporary Art from Denmark, European Central Bank, Frankfurt, Germany
2013 Everyone Carries a Room Inside, Museum on the Seam, Jerusalem, Israel
2013 Nyförvärv, Göteborgs Konstmuseum, Sweden
2013 Nordic Art Station, Eskilstuna, Sweden
2013 Das Nahe und die Ferne, Künstlerhaus Dortmund, Germany
2013 Cool Nordic, The Kennedy Center, Washington, USA
2012 New Nordic, Louisiana Museum of Modern Art, Denmark
2011 L’Enigme du portrait, Musée d’Art Contemporain, Marseille, France   
2011 Kiyosato Museum of Photographic Arts, Japan
2011 Danmark Under Forvandling, Heart Herning Museum of Art, Denmark
2010 Grønningen
2010 Danmark Under Forvandling, Museum of Photographic Art, Odense, Denmark (catalog)
2010 X-Tra Light, Kant Esbjerg, Denmark
2010 I Love You, ARoS Aarhus Museum of Art, Aarhus, Denmark (catalogue)
2010 This Way 10, Museum of Photographic Art, Odense, Denmark
2009 Altid som aldrig før, Skagen Art Museum, Skagen, Denmark (catalogue)
2009 D-Stop, O’born Contemporary, Toronto, Canada
2008 Present Perfect Portraits, Martin Asbæk Projects, Denmark
2007 Reality Crossings, Wilhelm Hack Museum, 2. Fotofestival, Mannheim/Ludwigs/Heidelberg, Germany
2006 I Skumringen, Galleri Larm, Copenhagen, Denmark
2006 Scandinavian Photography, Houston, USA (catalogue)
2006 New Photography, Scandinavia House, New York City (catalogue)
2006 Closed Eyes, Museum of Photographic Art, Odense, Denmark
2006 The Open Book, The National Museum of Photography, Copenhagen, Denmark (catalogue)
2005 Scandinavian Photography, Faulconer Gallery, Iowa, USA (catalogue)
2006 Emergencias, Musac, Museo de Arte contemporaneo de Castilla y Leon, Spain (catalogue)
2005 Young Portfolio Acquisition 2004, The Kiyosato Museum of Photographic Arts, Japan (catalogue)
2004 Body, Galleri GimEis, Copenhagen, Denmark (catalogue)
2004 Pro, Charlottenborg, Copenhagen, Denmark
2004 Kvinder stiller skarpt, Dannerhuset, Copenhagen, Denmark
2003 Fra objektiv til objekt, Den Fri Udstillingsbygning, Copenhagen, Denmark
2003 Making Eyes, Fotografisk Center, Copenhagen, Denmark, (catalogue)
2003 www.woman2003.dk, billboard exhibition, Copenhagen/Malmø, Denmark/Sweden (catalogue)
2002 Never Ending Story, billboard exhibition, Copenhagen, Denmark
2001 Faces And Figures, Scandinavian House, New York City
2001 Repor På En Slat Yta, Hasselblad Center, Göteborg, Sweden
2001 Scrathes on A Smooth Surface, Hasselblad Center, Göteborg, Sweden
2001 Spejlkabinettet, Museum of Art Photography, Odense, Denmark
1999 Young Danish Photography, Fotografisk Center, Copenhagen, Denmark (catalogue)
1999 From The Hidden, The National Museum of Photography, Copenhagen, Denmark
1999 Modern Times, Hasselblad Center, Göteborg, Sweden (catalogue)
1998 1000 år 10, Museum for Contemporary Art, Roskilde, Denmark
1997 PRO – Nu da du er min, Charlottenborg, Copenhagen, Denmark (catalogue)
1996 Fra alle os til alle jer, Albertlund Rådhus, Albertslund, Denmark

Group exhibitions: Trine Søndergaard & Nicolai Howalt
2010 Grønningen, Copenhagen, Denmark
2010 KUP, Hans Alf Gallery, Copenhagen, Denmark
2010 I Love You, ARoS Aarhus Museum of Art, Aarhus, Denmark (catalogue)
2010 Jagten – på noget andet, Johannes Larsen Museet, Kerteminde, Denmark (catalogue)
2009 Summer in the City, Martin Asbæk Gallery, Denmark
2008 Musée Historique et des Porcelaines, Ville de Nyon, France (catalogue)
2008 Grønningen, Bornholm Art Museum, Denmark (catalogue)
2008 Parallel Landscapes, Gallery Myymälä2, Helsinki, Finland
2008 Springtime, Henningsen Contemporary, Copenhagen, Denmark
2008 Hunting Grounds, Max Estrella Gallery, Madrid, Spain
2008 On hunting, Gallery Andreas Grimm, Münich, Germany
2008 Danskjävlar, Kunsthal Charlottenborg, Copenhagen, Denmark (catalogue)
2007 Lys over Lolland, Denmark (catalogue)
2007 Lianzhou International Photo Festival, Lianzhou, China
2007 Existencias, Musac Museo de Arte Contemporaneo de Castilla y Leon, Spain (catalogue)
2007 Mia Sundberg Galleri, Stockholm, Sweden
2007 Salon 1, Museumsbygningen, Denmark
2007 The Animal Show, Galleri Hornbæk, Denmark
2007 New Journal, Møstings Hus, Frederiksberg, Denmark
2007 One Shot Each, Museum of Photographic Art, Odense, Denmark (catalogue)
2007 Acquisitions 1999–2006, Fondation Neuflize, Maison Européenne de la Photographie. Ville de Paris, Paris, France
2007 Hunter & Gatherer, Gallery Ferenbalm-Gurbrü Station, Karlsruhe, Germany
2007 New Photography From Denmark, Houston, USA (catalogue)
2006 Summer in The City II, Martin Asbæk Projects, Copenhagen, Denmark
2006 Artist Choice, Bendixen Contemporary, Copenhagen, Denmark
2006 Another Adventure, Style Cube Zandari, Seoul, Korea (catalogue)
2006 New Adventures, Danish Contemporary Photography & Video, China (catalogue)
2006 New Adventures, Danish Contemporary Photography & Video, Korea (catalogue)
2006 Summer in The City, Martin Asbæk Projects, Copenhagen, Denmark
2003 Familiebilleder, Kunsthallen Brænderigaarden, Viborg, Denmark (catalogue)
2000 Longterm Projects, Underground, Galleri Asbæk, Copenhagen, Denmark

Collections
ARoS, Aarhus Art Museum, Denmark
Art Foundation Mallorca, Spain
Art Pradier Collection, Switzerland
Bornholms Art Museum, Denmark
Carlsberg Museum, Denmark
Cornell Fine Arts Museum, United States
Fanø Art Museum, Denmark
Fondation Neuflize Vie, Paris, France
'Fondazione Cassa di Risparmio di Modena, Italy
Gothenburg Museum of Art, Gothenburg, Sweden
Hasselblad Foundation, Sweden
Henry Art Gallery, United States
Kastrupgårdsamlingen, Denmark
Kiyosato Museum of Photographic Arts, Japan
Kunsten – Museum of Modern Art Aalborg, Denmark
Kunstmuseet i Tønder, Denmark
La Casa Encendida, Madrid, Spain
Le Delta – Province de Namur, Belgium
Maison Européenne de la Photographie, France
Montreal Museum of Fine Art, Canada
MUSAC, Leon, Spain
Musée d’Art Moderne André Malraux, France
Museet for Fotokunst, Brandts, Denmark
Museum Kunst der Westküste, Germany
Museum of Fine Arts, Houston, United States
Museum on the Seam, Jerusalem, Israel
National Museum of Women in the Arts, United Kingdom
Nykredit, Denmark
Skagens Art Museum, Denmark
Skive Museum, Denmark
Statoil Art Collection, Norway
The Danish Arts Foundation, Denmark
The Israel Museum, Jerusalem
The J.Paul Getty Museum, United States
The Lewis Glucksman Gallery, Ireland
The National Museum of Art, Norway
The National Museum of Photography, Denmark
The New Carlsberg Foundation, Denmark
The Sir Mark Fehrs Haukohl Photography Collection, LACMA and Brooklyn Museum, United States

Awards and grants 

 Ole Haslunds Kunstnerlegat (honorary grant), Denmark
 Ny Carlsbergs Kunstner Legat (honorary grant), Denmark
 Poeten Poul Sørensens Legat (honorary grant), Denmark
 The Most Beautiful German Book Prize 2014, Germany
 Aage and Yelva Nimbs Fond, 2012 (honorary grant), Denmark
 Anne Marie Telmanyi, født Carl-Nielsens Fond, 2012 (honorary grant), Denmark
 The Academy Council, 2010 (honorary grant), Denmark
 Nomination for the Deutsche Börse Photography Prize 2006, 2011, United Kingdom
 Three-year working grant, the Danish Arts Foundation, 2009-2011, Denmark
 Fogtdals Rejselegat 2009, Denmark
 Special Jury Prize 2006, Paris Photo 2006, France
 Niels Wessel Bagge Arts Foundation, 1998, Denmark
 The Albert Renger-Patzsch Prize, 2000, Germany     
 Joop Swart World Press Master Class, 2000, Netherlands
 Award for a young artist, Museum of Contemporary Art, Roskilde, 1998, Denmark
 The New Carlsberg Foundation, Denmark
 The Danish Arts Agency, Denmark
 The Danish Arts Foundation, Denmark
 Ragnvald og Ida Blix Fond, Denmark
 Københavns Kommunes Billedkunstråd, Denmark
 Nordea Danmark Fonden, Denmark
 The National Workshop for Arts and Crafts, Denmark
 The Danish Ministry of Culture Development Fund, Denmark

References

External links
 Fatamorgana
 FOTO: New Photography from Denmark
 
Exploring emptiness from within. An interview with Trine Søndergaard Video by Louisiana Channel

1972 births
Living people
21st-century Danish photographers
Danish photographers